is a documentary television series produced by Japan Broadcasting Corporation (NHK) that first aired throughout the 1980s. The travelogue traced the ancient Silk Road from Chang'an (modern day Xi'an) to Rome covering the history, archaeology, culture, religion, and art of countries along the route.

The series first aired in Japan on 7 April 1980, with sequels being broadcast over a 10-year period. It took a total of 17 years from conception to complete what many consider a landmark in Japan's broadcast television history. The intention of the program was to reveal how ancient Japan was influenced by the exchange of goods and ideas along the trade route.

Background 
In September 1972, an NHK director covered Japanese Prime Minister Tanaka Kakuei's visit to Beijing, China. During the visit, Chinese Premier Zhou Enlai invited journalists and reporters for their support in introducing China to the rest of the world, which signalled the thaw of post-war Sino-Japanese relation. The director proposed Silk Road could be the subject of a TV program to illustrate cultural exchange between China and the rest of the world. The executives of NHK supported this idea, but by mid-1970s the camera crew for another program had not been able to enter the Silk Road region. A breakthrough came after various negotiations by the end of October 1978, with Deputy-Premier Deng Xiaoping's visit to Japan. On New Year's Eve 1978, permission was granted and a joint project with China Central Television (CCTV) was born.

It was the first time a foreign television crew was granted entry into the Silk Road region within Chinese territory, who captured the country at the beginning of the economic reform. The historic documentary also reflected international tension in the Central and Western Asia regions at the time, as it was produced in the immediate aftermath of the Soviet–Afghan War and during the Iran–Iraq War.

Since the program was first broadcast in the 1980s, several archaeological sites visited in the program have since been destroyed by natural disasters or by the Islamic State of Iraq and the Levant.

Production 
The first series was jointly produced with China's CCTV, which began filming in September 1979. The 12-part series covers segments of the Silk Road within the People's Republic of China from Xi'an up to the Chinese borders with Pakistan and the former Soviet Union. It was first aired in Japan on 7 April 1980.

The second series covers segments of the Silk Road outside of China in the Indian subcontinent, Central and Western Asia, Caucasus, Anatolia, until the crew reached Rome, Italy. The 18-part series was broadcast between April 1983 and September 1984.

While the series makes frequent references to early Western explorers of the early 20th Century like Sven Hedin, Aurel Stein and Pyotr Kozlov, as well as the legendary travels of Xuanzang, contemporary orientalists such as Inoue Yasushi, Ryōtarō Shiba, Chin Shunshin and Kato Kiyoshi participated in the series and provided expert consultation who also later published their own travelogues.

The original Japanese version was narrated by Kôji Ishizaka, and the English version was narrated by Australian actor and presenter Graham Webster (first series only).

Episodes 
{| class="wikitable sortable plainrowheaders" style="width:100%;"
|-style="color:white"
! style="background: #FF69B4;" |Episode
! style="background: #FF69B4;" |Title
! style="background: #FF69B4;" |Original air date
|-

|}

Accolades
On average, The Silk Road was watched by about 20% of the viewing audience. In response to viewers' requests that the series be extended to cover the Silk Road all the way to Rome, sequels were made over the next 10 years. The series was broadcast in 38 countries in Asia and Europe.

Writer Ryōtarō Shiba described The Silk Road series as "the most fruitful Sino-Japanese cultural exchange in postwar history."

The popularity of the series launched the career of Kitaro who produced the theme and background music. Kitaro was awarded at the 18th Galaxy Awards for his work with the series.

Spin-off 

In 2005, in commemoration of NHK's 80th anniversary, CCTV and NHK jointly produced for the second time a Silk Road documentary. The 10-part series, according to the general director, takes a new approach to the subject, as it reveals many of the archaeological discoveries and relics that have not been disclosed to the public in previous documentaries.  The footage was edited into separate Chinese and Japanese versions. Known as The New Silk Road, the Chinese language series was first aired in 10 March 2006.

Related books and media 
As part of NHK's 80th anniversary in 2005, the footage was digitally remastered, and broadcast in conjunction with NHK's "New Silk Road" special. DVD set with remastered version is also being sold.

English dub was released and distributed by Central Park Media on VHS in 1990. A digitally remastered DVD set was released in 2005.

Eighteen books were published on the making of The Silk Road and 3 million copies were sold. A 10-volume photo series sold 660,000 copies, and 380,000 videos, too, were sold. Seven million records and CDs of the soundtrack have been sold in Japan and abroad.

" Silk Road Silk Road " Ogatsuka Seigo and other photos (6 volumes), 1980 - 81 - each · Japan Broadcasting Publishing Association
"The way to Silk Road Rome" (6 volumes), 1983 - 198
"NHK Silk Road Pilgrim Road to Road"
(New Compact · All 12 volumes), 1988 - 89 - The above new edition version
"Silk Road Photo Collection" (6 volumes), 1981 - 198, New Edition 1997
"Silk Road of NHK Sea" (6 volumes in total), 1988–89
"Photo book NHK Sea Silk Road" (4 volumes), 1988–89, New Edition 1997

References

External links 
 

NHK original programming
China Central Television original programming
China–Japan relations
1980 Japanese television series debuts
1981 Japanese television series endings
Japanese documentary television series
Chinese documentary television series
1980s travel television series
1980s Japanese television series
1980s Chinese television series
Japanese travel television series